The mouse brain refers to the brain of Mus musculus. Various brain atlases exist.

For reasons of reproducibility, genetically characterized, stable strains like C57BL/6 were chosen to produce high-resolution images and databases. Well known online resources include:
Allen Brain Atlas
 Mouse Brain Library
High resolution mouse brain atlas
BrainMaps
High-Resolution Brain Maps and Brain Atlases of Mus musculus

Despite superficial differences, especially in size and weight, the mouse brain and its function can serve as a powerful animal model for study of human brain diseases or mental disorders (see e.g. Reeler, Chakragati mouse). This is because the genes responsible for building and operating both mouse and human brain are 90% identical. Transgenic mouse lines also allow neuroscientists to specifically target the labeling of certain cell types to probe the neural basis of fundamental processes.

Anatomy
The cerebral cortex of a mouse has around 8–14 million neurons while in those humans there are more than 10–15 billion. The olfactory bulb volume takes about 2% of the mouse brain by volume in contrast to about 0.01% of the human brain.

Development
Mouse brain development timeline

See also
List of animals by number of neurons

References

Mus (rodent)
Brain
Brain anatomy